PARENA  or Parena can refer to
 Party for National Recovery (Parti pour le redressement national, PARENA) - a political party in Burundi
 Party for National Rebirth (Parti pour la renaissance nationale, PARENA) - a political party in Mali
 Parena (beetle), a genus of beetles in the family Carabidae